James Shaw (12 March 1865 – 22 January 1921) was an English first-class cricketer, who played three matches for Yorkshire County Cricket Club in 1896 and 1897.

Born in Linthwaite, Huddersfield, Yorkshire, England, Shaw was a slow left arm orthodox spin bowler, who took seven wickets at 25.85, with a best of 4 for 119 against Cambridge University.  A right-handed batsman, he scored 8 runs in three innings with a top score of 7, also against Cambridge University.  He took two catches in the field.

Shaw died in January 1921 in Armley, Leeds, Yorkshire.

References

External links
Cricinfo Profile

1865 births
1921 deaths
Yorkshire cricketers
United North of England Eleven cricketers
Cricketers from Huddersfield
English cricketers